Cyrestis telamon  is a butterfly of the family Nymphalidae. It is found in the Malay Archipelago. The larva feeds on Streblus ilicifolius.

Subspecies
C. p. paulinus Moluccas
C. p. waigeuensis Fruhstorfer, 1900 Waigeu
C. p. seneca Wallace, 1869 Sula Islands
C. p. mantilis Staudinger, 1886 Sulawesi, Togian
C. p. kuehni Röber, 1886 Banggai
C. p. kransi Jurriaanse & Lindemans, 1920 Butung, Wowoni
C. p. cassander C. & R. Felder, 1863 Philippines (Luzon)
C. p. dacebalus Fruhstorfer, 1913 Philippines (Leyte)
C. p. orchomenus Fruhstorfer, 1913 Philippines (Basilan, Mindanao)
C. p. thessa Fruhstorfer, 1900 Palawan

References

Cyrestinae
Butterflies described in 1860